Lisa J. White is a teacher and translator of Arabic. She was born in Philadelphia and obtained her BA from Penn State University and her MA from Harvard University. She currently teaches Arabic at the American University in Cairo. She won the Arkansas Arabic Translation Award for her translation of Little Songs in the Shade of Tamaara by the poet Mohammed Afifi.

References

American translators
Arabic–English translators
Educators from Philadelphia
Pennsylvania State University alumni
Harvard University alumni
Academic staff of The American University in Cairo
Living people
Year of birth missing (living people)
American expatriates in Egypt
American women writers
American women academics
21st-century American women